Adam Kay may refer to:

 Adam Kay (footballer) (born 1990)
 Adam Kay (writer) (born 1980), British comedian, writer, musician, and doctor

See also
Adam Kaye (born 1968), British businessman and restaurateur